Expeditie Robinson 2014 is the sixteenth season of the RTL5 reality television series Expeditie Robinson first aired on September 4, 2014. It's the first season hosted by Nicolette Kluijver and the third season hosted by Dennis Weening.

Survivors

 Kamp Blauw
 Kamp Geel
 Kamp Rood
 Hel
 Basis Kamp
 Winnaarseiland

Future Appearances
Loek Peters and Anouk Maas returned to compete in Expeditie Robinson 2021. Krystl Pullens, Ferry Doedens and Kay Nambiar returned to compete in Expeditie Robinson: All Stars.

References

External links
 Official website Expeditie Robinson

Dutch reality television series
Expeditie Robinson seasons
2014 Dutch television seasons